Really Saying Something: The Platinum Collection is one of several greatest hits collections by British girl group Bananarama, released in 2005. It was the second hits package released by Warner Music Group, the parent company of Bananarama's label London Records. (The first was The Very Best of Bananarama in 2001.)

The 2005 compilation contains both singles and album tracks. Several songs were included on a Bananarama hits package for the first time. The collection also includes the song called "State I'm In" from their 1984 eponymous Bananarama album, which wasn't released as a single but had a music video shot for it.

Track listing
 "Really Saying Something" (with Fun Boy Three)
 "Young at Heart"
 "What a Shambles"
 "Robert De Niro's Waiting..."
 "State I'm In"
 "Rough Justice"
 "Do Not Disturb"
 "A Cut Above the Rest"
 "I Can't Help It"
 "Once in a Lifetime"
 "I Want You Back"
 "Love, Truth and Honesty"
 "Cruel Summer '89"
 "Only Your Love"
 "Is Your Love Strong Enough"
 "Heartless"
 "More, More, More"
 Tempus Fugit Mix: "Venus" / "I Heard a Rumour" / "Love in the First Degree"

2005 greatest hits albums
Bananarama compilation albums